Faustino Casas Hernández, O. de M. (1604–1686) was a Roman Catholic prelate who served as Bishop of Paraguay (1674–1686).

Biography
Faustino Casas Hernández was born in Casarrubuelos, Spain in 1604 and ordained a priest in the Order of the Blessed Virgin Mary of Mercy.
On 7 December 1674, he was appointed during the papacy of Pope Clement X as Bishop of Paraguay.
In 1675, he was consecrated bishop. 
He served as Bishop of Paraguay until his death on 2 August 1686.

References

External links and additional sources
 (for Chronology of Bishops) 
 (for Chronology of Bishops)  

17th-century Roman Catholic bishops in Paraguay
Bishops appointed by Pope Clement X
1604 births
1686 deaths
Mercedarian bishops
Roman Catholic bishops of Paraguay